Hal Leonard LLC (formerly Hal Leonard Corporation) is an American music publishing and distribution company founded in Winona, Minnesota, by Harold "Hal" Edstrom, his brother, Everett "Leonard" Edstrom, and fellow musician Roger Busdicker. Currently headquartered in Milwaukee, Wisconsin, it is the largest sheet music publisher in the world.

History

1947 to 2016
The company produces sheet music, songbooks, and method book (with audio) packs, and band, orchestra, and choral arrangements, reference books, instructional videos, and instrumental accompaniments. In addition, they distribute other brands, such as Gibraltar, Gretsch Drums, Avid, Blue Microphones, and many more. In 1989, Hal Leonard acquired Jenson Publications and its catalog of band, orchestra, and choral titles. In 1995, Hal Leonard began distributing Homespun Music Instruction instructional video and audio materials.

In 1997, Hal Leonard and Music Sales Group founded SheetMusicDirect.com, the world's first website for digital sheet music and guitar tablature. In 2004, Hal Leonard acquired Applause Theatre and Cinema Books. In 2006, Hal Leonard acquired Amadeus Press and Limelight Editions. Also in 2006, Hal Leonard acquired Backbeat Books, which publishes the AllMusic reference guide and other music-related publications, from CMP.

In 2009, Hal Leonard acquired Shawnee Press from Music Sales Group. In 2014, Hal Leonard acquired Noteflight, an online music notation service and a community for sharing scores. Private equity firm Seidler Equity Partners acquired majority ownership of the company in June 2016. Following the change in ownership, Hal Leonard was reorganized from a corporation to a limited liability company.

2017 to present
In 2017, Hal Leonard acquired the online music retailer Sheet Music Plus. In 2018, Hal Leonard purchased the physical and online printed music businesses of global independent music publisher The Music Sales Group. They also acquired Groove3, a leading website specializing in music technology tutorial videos. In December 2018, Hal Leonard announced it had sold five of its trade imprints—Hal Leonard Books, Applause Theatre & Cinema Books, Amadeus Press, Backbeat Books, and Limelight Editions—to Rowman & Littlefield.

As of 2020, Hal Leonard publishes, distributes, and represents the print music interests for a myriad of publishing companies, both classical and popular. In North America, Hal Leonard is the exclusive licensee of the print rights for Disney Music Group and Universal Music Publishing Group. Hal Leonard is also the North American distributor of numerous American and European classical publishers, including G. Schirmer, Inc., Boosey & Hawkes, Éditions Durand, and Faber Piano Adventures. Through its acquisition of numerous school music publishing companies over the past 40 years, Hal Leonard is currently one of the largest music publishers in the field of music education; its primary competitor in the educational market is Alfred Music.

The Hal Leonard corporate headquarters is in Milwaukee, Wisconsin. Their distribution, production and warehousing facilities are in Winona, Minnesota. They also have offices in Austin, Boston, and San Francisco. It also has offices abroad in Australia, Belgium, China, Germany, the Netherlands, India, Italy, Switzerland, as well as in London and Bury St. Edmunds in England.

Hal Leonard has sponsored many awards to young musicians and educators. Hal Leonard has partnered with the Jazz Education Network to offered the Hal Leonard Collegiate Scholarship, which was awarded to Tanner Guss in 2017.

References

External links

Keith Murdak NAMM Oral History Interview (2003)
Larry Morton NAMM Oral History Interview (2012)
Dan Bauer NAMM Oral History Interview (2014)

L
Publishing companies established in 1947
Companies based in Milwaukee
Music publishing companies of the United States
1947 establishments in Minnesota
Privately held companies based in Wisconsin